Emumäe is a village in Väike-Maarja Parish, Lääne-Viru County, in northeastern Estonia. Prior to the administrative reforms of Estonian municipalities in 2017, it was located in Rakke Parish.

References

Villages in Lääne-Viru County
Kreis Wierland